Edward Stradling may refer to:

Edward Stradling (1528/29–1609), MP for Steyning 1554, MP for Arundel 1557–58 
 Sir Edward Stradling, 2nd Baronet (1601–1644) 
 Sir Edward Stradling, 3rd Baronet (c 1624–c 1660) of Cardiff Castle 
 Sir Edward Stradling, 4th Baronet (c 1643–1685) of the Stradling baronets 
 Sir Edward Stradling, 5th Baronet (1672–1735), MP for Cardiff Boroughs 1710–22
 Edward Stradling (1699–1726), son of the 5th Baronet, MP for Cardiff Boroughs 1722–26